Prunus subglabra is a species of plant in the family Rosaceae. It is endemic to the Philippines.

References

subglabra
Flora of the Philippines
Vulnerable plants
Taxonomy articles created by Polbot